The Barrosã is a cattle breed from Portugal. The Barrosã breed has the protected geographical status of DOC (Denominação de Origem Controlada) from the European Commission.

References

Cattle breeds originating in Portugal
Cattle breeds